

Gustav Adolf Heinrich Wagner (23 September 1890 – 14 May 1951) was a general in the Wehrmacht of Nazi Germany during World War II. He was a recipient of the Knight's Cross of the Iron Cross.

Awards and decorations

 Knight's Cross of the Iron Cross on 14 December 1941 as Oberst and commander of Infanterie-Regiment 44

References

Citations

Bibliography

 
 Mitcham Jr, Samuel W. (2009). The Men of Barbarossa: Commanders of the German Invasion of Russia - 1941. Havertown PA, USA. 

1890 births
1951 deaths
Major generals of the German Army (Wehrmacht)
People from East Prussia
German Army officers of World War II